Baron Grandison was a title that was created twice in the Peerage of England, both times for men, brothers Sir Otho de Grandison and William de Grandison, who were summoned to Parliament in 1299. The barony created for Sir Otho became extinct on his death in 1328. The barony created for William fell into abeyance on the death of the fourth Baron in 1375. The present Paston-Bedingfeld baronet is a co-heir to the barony of Grandison, in recognition of which the arms of Grandison are sculpted on an oriel window at Oxburgh Hall.

Barons Grandison (1299)
Otho de Grandison, 1st Baron Grandison (d. 1328)

Barons Grandison (1299) and notable issue
William de Grandison, 1st Baron Grandison (d. 1335). By Sibylla de Tregoz, his eight children were, sons listed first and final heir also listed:
Peter de Grandison, (also written as Piers de Grandison) 2nd Baron Grandison (lived 1287–1358, buried at Hereford Cathedral, August 1358.)
John
William
Otho (c.1300-1359)
Thomas de Grandison, 4th Baron Grandison (1339–1375) (He had no children. Title thereafter abeyant.)
Agnes (married Sir John de Northwode also written Northwood)
Mabilia (married John de Pateshull also written Pattishull in Salisbury)
Matilda (no known spouses)
 Catherine later known as Catherine Montagu, Countess of Salisbury (as married the 3rd Baron Montagu)

Children of Peter de Grandison:
John de Grandison (also written as Jean de Grandison), Bishop of Exeter, 3rd Baron Grandison (1350–1396)
Isabel (1340–1406) (married Sir Baldwin de Brugge) with whom she had 4 sons

Children of John de Grandison:
Henriette de Grandison (b. 1392, married de Vienne)

References

Footnotes

1299 establishments in England
Extinct baronies in the Peerage of England
Abeyant baronies in the Peerage of England
Noble titles created in 1299